Gonocerus juniperi  is a species of squash bugs belonging to the family Coreidae.

References

Gonocerini